Elsa Jacquemot was the defending champion, but participated in the women's singles event instead and lost to Elena Rybakina in the first round.

Linda Nosková won the title, defeating Erika Andreeva in the final, 7–6(7–3), 6–3.

Seeds

Draw

Finals

Top half

Section 1

Section 2

Bottom half

Section 3

Section 4

External links 
Draw at rolandgarros.com
Draw at ITFtennis.com

References

Girls' Singles
French Open, 2021 Girls' Singles